Donald Samuel Ornstein (born July 30, 1934, New York) is an American mathematician working in the area of ergodic theory.  He received a Ph.D. from the University of Chicago in 1957 under the guidance of Irving Kaplansky.  During his career at Stanford University  he supervised the Ph. D. thesis of twenty three students, including David H. Bailey, Bob Burton, Doug Lind, Ami Radunskaya, Dan Rudolph, and Jeff Steif.

He is most famous for his work on the isomorphism of Bernoulli shifts for which he won the 1974 Bôcher Prize. He has been a member of the National Academy of Sciences since 1981. In 2012 he became a fellow of the American Mathematical Society.

References and notes

20th-century American mathematicians
21st-century American mathematicians
Fellows of the American Mathematical Society
Members of the United States National Academy of Sciences
20th-century American Jews
Living people
1934 births
21st-century American Jews